Westerhouse House is a historic home located near Bridgetown, Northampton County, Virginia. It dates to about 1700, and is a small, one-story, four-bay, farmhouse with a steep gable roof and asymmetrical elevations. It features an exterior end chimney with a heavy pyramidal base, long sloping tiled weatherings and squat free-standing stack.

It was listed on the National Register of Historic Places in 1974.

References

External links
West House, Westerhouse Creek, Bridgetown, Northampton County, VA 1 photo and 3 measured drawings at Historic American Buildings Survey

Historic American Buildings Survey in Virginia
Houses on the National Register of Historic Places in Virginia
Houses completed in 1700
Houses in Northampton County, Virginia
National Register of Historic Places in Northampton County, Virginia
1700 establishments in Virginia